The following is a timeline of the presidency of Joe Biden during the third quarter of 2021, from July 1 to September 30, 2021. To navigate between quarters, see timeline of the Joe Biden presidency.

Timeline

July 2021

August 2021

September 2021

See also
 List of executive actions by Joe Biden
 List of presidential trips made by Joe Biden (international trips)
 Timeline of the 2020 United States presidential election

References

2021 Q3
Presidency of Joe Biden
July 2021 events in the United States
August 2021 events in the United States
September 2021 events in the United States
Political timelines of the 2020s by year
Articles containing video clips